Kauko Johannes Salomaa (28 February 1928 – 29 July 2016) was a Finnish speed skater. He competed at the 1952 and 1956 Winter Olympics in several distances with the best results of seventh in the 1500 m event in 1952.

References

1928 births
2016 deaths
Finnish male speed skaters
Olympic speed skaters of Finland
Speed skaters at the 1952 Winter Olympics
Speed skaters at the 1956 Winter Olympics